Berg is a municipality in the district of Hof in Bavaria, Germany.

History
Between 1966 and 1990, Berg's component village Rudolphstein served as the West German inner German border crossing for cars travelling between the East German Democratic Republic, or West Berlin and the West German Federal Republic of Germany. Traffic was subject to the Interzonal traffic regulations that followed the special regulations of the Transit Agreement (1972) made between West Germany and West Berlin

References

Hof (district)